is a passenger railway station located in the city of Chichibu, Saitama, Japan, operated by the private railway operator Chichibu Railway.

Lines

Station layout

The station is staffed and consists of one side platform and one island platform serving two tracks. An additional bidirectional line for freight services existed as track 3, but is now severed at both ends.

Platforms

Adjacent stations

History
Ōnohara Station opened on 27 October 1914.

Passenger statistics
In fiscal 2018, the station was used by an average of 1127 passengers daily.

Surrounding area
 Arakawa River
 
 
 Saitama Prefectural Chichibu Agriculture and Science High School

References

External links

 Ōnohara Station information (Saitama Prefectural Government) 
 Ōnohara Station timetable 

Railway stations in Japan opened in 1914
Railway stations in Saitama Prefecture
Chichibu, Saitama